Crashing Hollywood is a 1938 American comedy film directed by Lew Landers and written by Paul Yawitz and Gladys Atwater. The film stars Lee Tracy, Joan Woodbury, Paul Guilfoyle, Lee Patrick and Bradley Page. The film was released on January 7, 1938, by RKO Pictures. It is based on the 1922 play of the same title by Paul Dickey and Mann Page, previous adapted into the 1923 silent film Lights Out.

Plot
A screen writer meets a man recently out of jail and his wife on a train, they decide to collaborate and write a film, but trouble appears when a gangster is outraged by his depiction on the film.

Cast 

Lee Tracy as Michael Winslow
Joan Woodbury as Barbara Lang
Paul Guilfoyle as Herman Tibbets
Lee Patrick as Goldie Tibbets
Bradley Page as Thomas 'Tom' Darcy / 'The Hawk'
Richard Lane as Hugo Wells
Tom Kennedy as Al
George Irving as Alexander Peyton
Frank M. Thomas as Detective Decker
Jack Carson as Dickson
Alec Craig as Movie Studio Receptionist
Jimmy Conlin as Crisby
Willie Best as Train Porter (uncredited)

References

External links 
 

American black-and-white films
1930s English-language films
RKO Pictures films
Films directed by Lew Landers
1938 comedy films
1938 films
American comedy films
Films produced by Cliff Reid
American films based on plays
Remakes of American films
1930s American films